The Legislative Assembly of Sverdlovsk Oblast is the regional parliament of Sverdlovsk Oblast, a federal subject of Russia. A total of 50 deputies are elected for five-year terms.

Electoral system 
According to Article 32 of the Charter of Sverdlovsk Oblast, the Legislative Assembly is unicameral, with a total number of 50 members. 25 of them are elected in party lists, and the other 25 deputies are elected by single-mandate constituencies. The term length for deputies is five years.

History 
The Soviet-era Regional Council of People's Deputies was replaced by the Sverdlovsk Oblast Duma in 1994. Two years later, the Duma became the lower house of the newly established Legislative Assembly with the House of Representatives as its upper house. Elections were held to the House in 1996, 1998, 2000, 2004 and 2008 for all 21 seats. In the Sverdlovsk Oblast Duma, half of the total number of seats (14) was at stake every two years. In 2011, bicameralism was abandoned in Sverdlovsk Oblast and the new unicameral Legislative Assembly was elected.

Elections

2021

Composition

2011 
 United Russia — 29 seats
 A Just Russia — 9 seats
 Communist Party — 8 seats
 Liberal Democratic Party — 4 seats

2016 
 United Russia — 35 seats
 A Just Russia — 5 seats
 Communist Party — 4 seats
 Liberal Democratic Party — 4 seats

2021 
 United Russia — 33 seats
 Communist Party — 9 seats
 A Just Russia — For Truth — 4 seats
 Liberal Democratic Party — 2 seats
 New People — 2 seats

References 

Politics of Sverdlovsk Oblast
Defunct bicameral legislatures
Sverdlovsk Oblast